The Anglo–Spanish War was a war fought by Spain against the Kingdom of England, the Kingdom of Scotland and the United Provinces from 1625 to 1630. The conflict formed part of the Eighty Years' War.

Background
In 1622, Philip IV reigned in Spain, with Gaspar de Guzmán, Count-Duke of Olivares as his favourite. The War of Flanders had reignited after the Twelve Years' Truce, and Spain's finances flowed from its imports of silver from its American colonies. James I was King of England, Scotland and Ireland, with his son Charles, Prince of Wales, as his heir. At this time the Kingdom of England had military ties with the United Provinces, which they had assisted in the War of Flanders.

Around this time a series of events unfolded resulting in the resumption of hostilities between the two kingdoms. During the Thirty Years' War which broke out in Europe, Frederick V of the Palatinate and his wife Elizabeth Stuart, the daughter of the King of England, were defeated and dispossessed by the Spanish Tercios.

George Villiers, 1st Duke of Buckingham, accompanied the Prince of Wales on a trip to Madrid to arrange the details of the proposed wedding between Charles and Maria Anna of Spain, however these negotiations proved unsuccessful.

War
The 1624 Parliament voted three subsidies and three fifteenths, around £300,000 for the prosecution of the war, with the conditions that it be spent on a naval war. James, ever the pacifist, refused to declare war, and in fact never did. His successor, Charles I, was the one to declare war in 1625.

Siege of Breda

In August 1624, the Spanish general — Don Ambrosio Spinola — ordered his forces to lay siege to the Dutch city of Breda. The city was heavily fortified and defended by a garrison of 7,000 Dutch soldiers. Spinola rapidly gathered his defences and drove off a Dutch relief army under Maurice of Nassau, Prince of Orange, who was attempting to cut off his supplies. In February 1625, another relief force, consisting of 7,000 English soldiers under Sir Horace Vere and Ernst von Mansfeld, was also defeated.

Finally, Justin of Nassau surrendered Breda to the Spaniards in June 1625 after an eleven-month siege.

Cádiz Expedition

By October 1625, approximately 100 ships and a total of 15,000 seamen and soldiers were readied for the Cádiz Expedition. An alliance with the Dutch had also been forged, and the new allies agreed to dispatch an additional 15 warships commanded by William of Nassau, to assist in guarding the English Channel in the absence of the English main fleet. Sir Edward Cecil, a battle-hardened veteran of combat in service with the Dutch, was appointed commander of the expedition by the Duke of Buckingham, a choice that proved to be ill-considered. Cecil was a good soldier, but he had little knowledge of nautical matters.

The planned expedition involved several elements: overtaking Spanish treasure ships returning from the Americas loaded with valuables; and assaulting Spanish towns, with the intention of assailing the Spanish economy by weakening the Spanish supply chain and consequently relieving the military pressure on the Electorate of the Palatinate.

The entire expedition descended into farce. The English forces wasted time in capturing an old  fort of little importance, giving Cádiz the time to fully mobilise behind its defences and allowing merchant ships in the bay to make good their escape. The city's modernised defences, a vast improvement on those of Tudor times, proved effective. Meanwhile, a body of English forces landed further down the coast to march on the city also became side-tracked because of poor discipline. Eventually, Sir Edward Cecil, the commander of the English forces, faced with dwindling supplies, decided there was no alternative but to return to England, having captured few goods and having had no impact on Spain. And thus in December, a battered fleet returned home.

Charles I of England, to protect his own dignity and Buckingham, who had failed to ensure the invasion fleet was well supplied, made no effort to inquire as to the cause of the failure of the Cadiz Expedition. Charles turned a blind eye to the debacle, instead preoccupying himself with the plight of the French Huguenots of La Rochelle. But the House of Commons proved less forgiving. The parliament of 1626 initiated the process of impeachment against the Duke of Buckingham, prompting Charles I to choose to dissolve parliament rather than risk a successful impeachment.

The failure of the attack had severe consequences for England. In addition to the economic and human loss, it damaged the reputation of the English Crown, creating a serious political and financial crisis in the country.

1627–1628
The Duke of Buckingham then negotiated with the French regent, Cardinal Richelieu, for English ships to aid Richelieu in his fight against the French Huguenots, in exchange for French aid against the Spanish occupying the Electorate of the Palatinate, but the Parliament of England was disgusted and horrified at the thought of English Protestants fighting French Protestants. The plan only fuelled their fears of crypto-Catholicism at court. Buckingham himself, believing that the failure of his enterprise was the result of treachery by Richelieu, formulated an alliance among Cardinal Richelieu's many enemies, a policy that included support for the very Huguenots whom he had recently attacked.

The English force commanded by the Duke of Buckingham was defeated by the French Royal troops at the Siege of Saint-Martin-de-Ré and at the Siege of La Rochelle. In this campaign the English lost more than 4,000 men of a force of 7,000 men. On August 23, while organising a second campaign in Portsmouth, England in 1628, Buckingham was stabbed to death at the Greyhound Pub by John Felton, an army officer who had been wounded at the Siege of La Rochelle.

Dutch Revolt of 1626–29
After the surrender of Breda, the States gave orders for recruiting their army which consisted of 61,670 infantry and 5,853 cavalry; nearly 20,000 of whom were English and Scottish. Of these four were English regiments that King Charles had raised and sent to Holland. A part of this force was sent to the Spanish held city of Oldenzaal which was captured after a ten-day bombardment in the summer of 1626. The following year the English were under the command of Edward Cecil and contributed to the siege of the city of Groenlo. A Spanish relief force led by Hendrik van den Bergh failed to get through and as a result the city surrendered to the Dutch commander Frederick Henry, Prince of Orange. In 1629, the important Spanish stronghold of 's-Hertogenbosch was besieged and captured by Frederick Henry's army of 28,000 men which included a number of English and Scottish regiments all commanded by Horace Vere.

St. Kitts and Nevis
In 1629, a Spanish naval expedition, commanded by Admiral Don Fadrique de Toledo, was sent to deal with the recently established Anglo-French colonies on the Caribbean islands of Saint Kitts and Nevis. The territories were regarded by the Spanish Empire as its own since the islands were discovered by the Spanish in 1498 and the English and French colonies had grown sufficiently to be considered a threat to the Spanish West Indies. In the Battle of St. Kitts, the heavily armed settlements on both islands were destroyed and the Spanish seized the islands.

Aftermath
England altered its involvement in the Thirty Years War by negotiating a peace treaty with France in 1629. Thereafter expeditions were undertaken by the Duke of Hamilton and Earl of Craven to the Holy Roman Empire in support of the thousands of Scottish and English mercenaries already serving under the King of Sweden in that conflict. Hamilton's levy was raised despite the end of the Anglo-Spanish War. In addition English troops would constitute a large part of the States army but in their pay after 1630. In the following years under Frederick Henry and Horace Vere the cities of Maastricht and Rheinberg were recaptured.

With the advent of the War of the Mantuan Succession Spain sought peace with England in 1629 and so arranged a suspension of arms and an exchange of ambassadors. On 15 November the Treaty of Madrid was signed which ended the war and thus restored the 'Status quo'. It had proven a costly fiasco for England, whose merchants lost the profitable Flemish cloth markets to heavy custom duties after the war. The unsuccessful and unpopular outcome of the conflict fuelled the disputes between the Monarchy and Parliament that began before the English Civil War, to the point that the first charge against Charles I in the Grand Remonstrance was about the costs and mismanagement of the 1625 war with Spain.

Notes

References

Further reading
 
 
 
 
 
 
 
 Robert L. Brenner. Merchants and Revolution: Commercial Change, Political Conflict, and London's Overseas Traders, 1550-1653, Verso (2003) 
 John H. Elliot. Empires of the Atlantic World: Britain and Spain in America 1492-1830 Yale University Press 
 Robert F. Marx. Shipwrecks in the Americas, New York (1971) 
 Robert L. Paquette and Stanley L. Engerman. The Lesser Antilles in the Age of European Expansion, University Press of Florida (1996), 
 Richard B. Sheridan. Sugar and Slavery; An Economic History Of The British West Indies, 1623-1775 The Johns Hopkins University Press (April 1, 1974) 
 Timothy R. Walton. The Spanish Treasure Fleets by Pineapple Press, (1994) 
 David Marley. Wars of the Americas: a chronology of armed conflict in the New World, 1492 to the present, ABC-CLIO (1998), 
 Roger Lockyer. Buckingham, the Life and Political Career of George Villiers, First Duke of Buckingham, 1592–1628 (Longman, 1981).
 Paul Bloomfield. Uncommon People. A Study of England's Elite (London: Hamilton, 1955).

External links
 European Treaties Bearing on the History of the United ..., Issue 254,Volume 2, Frances Gardiner Davenport

 
Wars involving the states and peoples of Europe
Wars involving Spain
Wars involving England
Wars involving the Dutch Republic
17th-century conflicts
17th-century military history of the Kingdom of England
1620s in Europe
1630 in Europe
Spain–United Kingdom military relations
England–Spain relations